Mahe Nao was a monthly literary magazine published by the Department of Publications of the Government of Pakistan.

History
The magazine was founded in April 1949 by the Department of Publications of the Government of Pakistan. The first five issues were published in Karachi but starting from the sixth they were published in Dhaka. The magazine was pro-Pakistan with a nationalistic editorial stand that called for united between East and West Pakistan. The magazine was published in Bengali language but it used loan words from Arabic, Persian, Turkish, and Urdu languages that was different from Standard Bengali. The founding editor was Abdur Rashid. After him the magazine was subsequently edited by Abdul Quadir, Mizanur Rahman, Muhammad Mansuruddin, and Talim Hossain. The magazine published the writings of notable Bengali writers in East Pakistan. It stopped publication in November 1971 during the Bangladesh Liberation war and did not resume after the Independence of Bangladesh.

References

1949 establishments in Pakistan
Monthly magazines published in Bangladesh
Bengali-language magazines
Defunct literary magazines
Defunct magazines published in Bangladesh
Defunct magazines published in Pakistan
Government publications
Magazines established in 1949
Magazines disestablished in 1971
1971 disestablishments in Pakistan